The Government of Prince Edward Island refers to the provincial government of the province of Prince Edward Island.  Its powers and structure are set out in the Constitution Act, 1867.

In modern Canadian use, the term "government" referred broadly to the cabinet of the day (formally the Executive Council of Prince Edward Island), elected from the Legislative Assembly of Prince Edward Island and the non-political staff within each provincial department or agency – that is, the civil service.

The Province of Prince Edward Island is governed by a unicameral legislature, the Legislative Assembly of Prince Edward Island, which operates in the Westminster system of government. The political party that wins the largest number of seats in the legislature normally forms the government, and the party's leader becomes premier of the province, i.e., the head of the government.

Lieutenant-Governor of Prince Edward Island 

The functions of the Sovereign, Charles III, King of Canada, known in Prince Edward Island as the King in Right of Prince Edward Island, are exercised by the Lieutenant Governor of Prince Edward Island. The Lieutenant Governor is appointed by the Governor General of Canada on the recommendation of the Prime Minister of Canada, in consultation with the Premier of Prince Edward Island.

Ministries 

Department of Agriculture and Land
Department of Economic Growth, Tourism, and Culture
Department of Education and Lifelong Learning
Department of Environment, Water, and Climate Change
Department of Finance
Department of Fisheries and Communities
Department of Health and Wellness
Department of Justice and Public Safety
Department of Social Development and Housing
 Department of Transportation, Infrastructure and Energy

See also 
Politics of Prince Edward Island
2019 Prince Edward Island general election
2019 Prince Edward Island electoral reform referendum

Notes

References

External links
 Official Site